Pinarolo Po is a comune (municipality) in the Province of Pavia in the Italian region Lombardy, located about 45 km south of Milan and about 14 km southeast of Pavia.

Pinarolo Po borders the following municipalities: Barbianello, Bressana Bottarone, Casanova Lonati, Robecco Pavese, Santa Giuletta, Verrua Po.

References

Cities and towns in Lombardy